Stuff Ltd (previously Fairfax New Zealand) is a privately held news media company operating in New Zealand. It operates Stuff, the country's largest news website, and owns nine daily newspapers, including New Zealand's second and third-highest circulation daily newspapers, The Dominion Post and The Press, and the highest circulation weekly, Sunday Star-Times. Magazines published include TV Guide, New Zealand's top-selling weekly magazine. Stuff also owns social media network Neighbourly.

Stuff Ltd has been owned by Sinead Boucher since 31 May 2020. It was called Fairfax New Zealand Limited until 1 February 2018.

History 
The print publications and the Stuff website previously belonged to Independent Newspapers Limited, until they were sold to Australian company Fairfax Media in 2003. 

When a 7.8 earthquake struck Kaikōura 14 November 2016, cutting the town off via road access, Stuff (then Fairfax New Zealand) flew free copies of its newspapers to residents.

In 2016, Fairfax New Zealand and media company New Zealand Media and Entertainment (NZME) sought clearance from the Commerce Commission to merge their operations in New Zealand. As part of the merger proposal, Stuff's Australian owner Fairfax Media would have received a 41 per cent stake in the combined business plus $55 million cash. On 2 May 2017, the Commerce Commission declined to approve the merger. Stuff Ltd. and NZME appealed the Commission's decision to the Wellington High Court, which upheld the Commission's decision on 18 December 2017. In June 2018, the companies appealed the Commission's decision at the New Zealand Court of Appeal, which rejected their merger bid on 25 September 2018. In October 2018, Stuff and NZME abandoned their first merger attempt.

In December 2018 Fairfax Media merged with Australia's Nine Entertainment. In July 2019, Nine Entertainment attempted to sell Stuff but did not receive any adequate bids. In November 2019, NZME confirmed that it had entered into negotiations with Nine Entertainment to purchase Stuff and submitted a proposal to the New Zealand Government regarding a "possible transaction." NZME proposed a "Kiwishare" arrangement that would ringfence Stuff's editorial operations and protect local journalism.

On 11 May 2020, NZME offered to purchase Stuff for a symbolic $1 on the basis of saving jobs during the COVID-19 pandemic. In response, Stuff's parent company Nine Entertainment terminated further discussion with NZME. In response, NZME filed for an emergency injunction at the Auckland High Court to force Nine Entertainment back into negotiations. On 19 May, the Auckland High Court rejected NZME's bid for an interim injunction against Nine Entertainment.

On 25 May, Nine Entertainment agreed to sell Stuff to Stuff's chief executive Sinead Boucher for NZ$1, with the transaction due to be completed by 31 May. This marks the return of the company into New Zealand ownership. Nine will retain all of the proceeds of the sale of wholesale broadband business Stuff Fibre to telecommunications company Vocus Group, and ownership of Stuff's Wellington printing press.

Management
Allen Williams was chief executive officer of Fairfax New Zealand Limited from April 2009 until April 2013, when he was promoted to managing director of Australian Publishing Media. Andrew Boyle was acting managing director until Simon Tong started as managing director in September 2013. Tong left in March 2017, just days prior to the Commerce Commission announcing their final decision on the proposed Fairfax New Zealand merger with New Zealand Media and Entertainment (NZME). Tong was succeeded by Boyle as acting managing director until Sinead Boucher was appointed chief executive officer in August 2017. Boucher had first been employed by Fairfax as a branch office reporter for The Press in 1993.

Current publications

Major mastheads

Community newspapers

Auckland and Northland

Wellington

Waikato

Other

Magazines

Former publications 
Stuff announced in February 2018 that it would close or sell 28 of its smaller community and rural mastheads. The 28 titles are:

Digital properties 
In November 2017 Stuff Ltd took full ownership of hyper-local social media network Neighbourly, having first bought a 22.5 percent stake in December 2014. In May 2018 Stuff Ltd took full ownership of internet service provider Stuff Fibre, which won the People's Choice Award, NZ Broadband Provider of the Year, Best Fibre Broadband Provider, and Best Broadband Innovation at the 2019 Broadband Compare Awards. Stuff Ltd also had a 49 percent share in New Zealand-based energy retailer energyclubnz.

In 2019, Stuff Ltd launched a video platform, Play Stuff. The website hosts free content sourced from content providers such as BBC, Reuters and the Press Association as well as local content from NZ On Screen and Bravo New Zealand.

On 20 May 2020, Stuff sold Stuff Fibre to Vocus and sold its share of energyclubnz back to its founder.

Stuff Circuit 
In 2019, Stuff launched a longform journalism documentary series called Stuff Circuit with funding from New Zealand on Air. Notable titles have included Big Decision (abortion law reform), Life + Limb (New Zealand's military involvement in the War in Afghanistan), False Profit (which focused on conspiracy theorist and New Zealand Public Party founder Billy Te Kahika), Deleted (which looked at New Zealand companies alleged to be complicit in human rights abuses in Xinjiang), Disordered (which focused on the treatment of people with Foetal Alcohol Syndrome), and Fire and Fury (which looked at vaccine disinformation and conspiracy theories in the wake of the 2022 Wellington protests.

Awards 
Stuff Ltd has won both national and international awards for its corporate leadership and management.

See also 
 List of print media in New Zealand
 Mass media in New Zealand

References

 
Companies based in Wellington
Newspaper companies of New Zealand
New Zealand
Nine Entertainment